Ocós is a municipality in the San Marcos Department of Guatemala. It is situated on the Pacific Ocean coast, very close to the border with Mexico at  altitude and two big rivers: the Suchiate and the Naranjo rivers. On 23 January 2014, it lost about 2/3 of its territory when La Blanca was named the thirtieth San Marcos Department municipality.

History

1897 Quetzaltenango Revolt 

In September 1897, after the failure of both the interoceanic railroad and the Central American Expo and the deep economic crisis that Guatemala was facing after the plummeting of both coffee and silver international prices, Quetzaltengo people raised in arms against the decision of present José María Reina Barrios to extend his presidential term until 1902. A group of rebels, among them a former Secretary of Reina Barrios's cabinet - Próspero Morales - began to combat on 7 September 1897 attacking San Marcos; after several battles and some gains in Ocós, Coatepeque and Colomba, the rebels were definitely defeated on 4 October 1897. As a result, on 23 October 1897, San Pedro Sacatepéquez became the capital of San Marcos Department.

Secession of La Blanca

On 23 January 2014, La Blanca split from Ocós after the Congress of Guatemala approved the separation by 115 of 158 possible. This meant that Ocós lost both 66% of its territory and population.

Climate

Ocós has a tropical savanna climate (Köppen: Aw).

See also
 
 
 La Aurora International Airport
 Tapachula International Airport

Notes and references

References

External links

Municipalities of the San Marcos Department
Surfing locations